"Sentimental Journey" is a popular song, published in 1944. The music was written by Les Brown and Ben Homer, and the lyrics were written by Bud Green.

History
Les Brown and His Band of Renown had been performing the song, but were unable to record it because of the 1942–44 musicians' strike.  When the strike ended, the band, with Doris Day as vocalist, recorded the song for Columbia Records on November 20, 1944, and they had a hit record with the song, Doris Day's first #1 hit, in 1945. The song's release coincided with the end of the Second World War in Europe and became the unofficial homecoming theme for many veterans.  The recording was released by Columbia Records as catalog number 36769, with the flip side "Twilight Time". The record first reached the Billboard charts on March 29, 1945, and lasted 23 weeks on the chart, peaking at #1.
The song actually reached the charts after the later-recorded "My Dreams Are Getting Better All the Time".

About this same time, the Merry Macs had a recording following Brown and Day which featured a bouncy arrangement where the group modulates (or augments) the verse eight times in the last half of the song – a vocal feat for any group attempting to record a song in one take without the benefit of tape editing in that era of modern recording.

The song later became something of a standard with jazz artists and was recorded by, among others, Buck Clayton with Woody Herman and by Ben Sidran. Frank Sinatra recorded his version of the song in 1961. Rosemary Clooney issued an album Sentimental Journey (2001) which included the song.  Harry James recorded a version in 1965 on his album New Versions of Down Beat Favorites (MGM E-4265).

Lyrics 
The song describes someone about to take a train to a place to which they have a great emotional attachment and their mounting anticipation while wondering why they ever roamed away. The opening verse is:

Gonna take a sentimental journey
Gonna set my heart at ease
Gonna make a sentimental journey
To renew old memories.

Cover versions
 Dinah Shore recorded it in 1945.  Capitol Records reissued on Sentimental Journey - Capitol's Great Ladies of Song (Vol. 2) 1992 
 Conway Twitty recorded a rock & roll version for his 1959 album Conway Twitty Sings on MGM Records.
 Paul Fenoulhet with The Skyrockets Dance Orchestra Voc.: Cyril Shane. Recorded in London on October 10, 1945. It was released by EMI on the HMV Records label as catalogue number BD 5908
 Ella Fitzgerald recorded this song with Eddie Heywood and his Orchestra in 1947, it was later released on her Decca album "Ella and Her Fellas"
 In 1951, Brown's orchestra redid the song, with The Ames Brothers on vocals. This was released by Coral Records as catalog number 60566, with the flip side "Undecided".
 Ralph Marterie released the song as part of the album Marvelous Marterie in 1959.
 Margie Rayburn released a version of the song as the B-side to her 1960 single "Magic Words".
 Juan García Esquivel covered the song on Infinity in Sound, Vol. 2 (April 1961, RCA Victor), replacing the vocal part with whistling. 
 The String-A-Longs recorded an instrumental version with three guitars, bass, and drums for their 1961 debut album, "Pick A Hit", Warwick LP #2036
 The Platters covered this song in 1963.
 Booker T. & the M.G.'s recorded an instrumental cover of this song for their 1966 album And Now!.
 Italian singer Mina released the song as part of the album "" Dedicato a mio padre""  in 1967.
 Harpers Bizarre covered the song on the album The Secret Life of Harpers Bizarre in 1968.
 Ringo Starr covered this song for his 1970 album Sentimental Journey.
 Japanese folk singer Shiva recorded a Japanese version of this song for his 1973 CBS/Sony album "コスモスによせる".
 Dave Dudley brought the song to country music with his top-50 version in 1976.
 Nellie McKay recorded her own arrangement as part of her album Normal as Blueberry Pie – A Tribute to Doris Day.
 Little Willie Littlefield recorded a version for his 1990 album Singalong with Little Willie Littlefield.
 In 1994, Les Brown and His Band of Renown teamed up to back Barry Manilow on a version of the song for Manilow's album "Singin' with the Big Bands".
 Sarah Harmer and Jason Euringer covered this tune on their 1999 album ""Songs  for Clem"".
 In 2010, Bob and Bernice Thorpe sang this song in the popular theatre show, ""Prop 8 Love Stories"" .
 In 2000, Jan Jankeje Trio jazzpointrecords
 In 2000/2001, singer-songwriter Amy Winehouse, who was 17 years-old at the time, recorded an acoustic cover of this song, with Sam Beste on the piano. This cover of Winehouse was not known, until her father, Mitchell recovered it in June 2014. 
 Lynda Carter covered this song for her 2011 album Crazy Little Things. 
 In 2013, Emmy Rossum covered this song in her album Sentimental Journey.
 George Clinton and Parliament-Funkadelic Incorporate the song into their huge hit "Not Just Knee Deep" when performing the song live.
 Bob Dylan covered the song on his 2017 album Triplicate.

In popular culture 

The song features prominently in the 1978 M*A*S*H episode "Your Hit Parade", as Col. Potter – citing a long-standing infatuation with Doris Day – requests the song be played over the camp P.A. system several times during the day.

In the UK spot on The Muppet Show Episode 3:08 with Loretta Lynn, Gonzo and Kermit the Frog sang the song on their way back to the show.

It was the theme song of the  ABC Radio program Sentimental Journey presented by John West.

The song is featured in Season 2, Episode 4 of The Man in the High Castle.

References

1944 songs
1945 singles
Songs with music by Les Brown (bandleader)
Songs with lyrics by Bud Green
Ames Brothers songs
Doris Day songs
Ella Fitzgerald songs
Little Willie Littlefield songs
Margie Rayburn songs
Number-one singles in the United States
Songs of World War II
Songs about trains
Music published by MPL Music Publishing